Bilal Saeed ( born 12 December 1988) is a Pakistani singer-songwriter, music producer and composer. He is best known for his singles "12 Saal" , "Adhi Adhi raat " and 'Teri khair mangdi" . The latter was also used in the Bollywood film Baar Bar Dekho.

Early life 
Bilal Saeed was born in Sialkot, Pakistan in a Punjabi Muslim family. He began his career as a music composer and writer. He gained popularity through his debut single "12 Saal" in 2011 and "Adhi Adhi Raat" (also known as Oooo meme song) in 2012.

Career 
In 2012, he released his new single "Mahi Mahi" and debut album "Twelve" which received two nominees at PTC Punjabi Music Award for Best Non Residents Punjabi Album and Best Non Resident Punjabi Vocalist. The album also featured Dr Zeus, Amrinder Gill and Fateh. A single "Khair Mangdi" from the album was nominated as Song of the Year at 13th Lux Style Awards. In 2013, for the first time he recorded songs for a film, i.e. "Tauba Tauba" and "Rattan Chitian" from Daddy Cool Munde Fool 2013 Punjabi film. In 2014, he released a single "Lethal Combination" with Roach Killa under Beyond Records in 2014. The single topped BBC Asian Charts. Later in December 2014, he composed a tribute song "Maan" on Peshawar Attack (Black Day Pakistan, 16 December 2014), to condemn the attackers of APS School, Peshawar. He also released a single "Kaash (A Wish)" in 2015 which topped the iTunes Chart. He made his Bollywood debut in 2015 by composing soundtrack of the film Ishqedarriyaan with Jeet Ganguly and Jaidev Kumar. He released another single in 2016 "Paranday", followed by 'Blah Blah Blah' featuring Punjabi Rapper Young Desi in August 2016. In 2016, the remake of his song "Khair Mangdi" featured in Karan Johar's Bollywood movie Baar Baar Dekho. In September 2016, he made his Lollywood debut by composing a song "Chulbul" for Pakistani Film Zindagi Kitni Haseen Hay. One more single of Bilal Saeed released in January 2017 "No Makeup", which featured Bohemia. Later in 2017 he released another single "Twinkle Twinkle" along with Young Desi in August. In early November he released another single "Suroor" with Neha Kakkar on 3 November to be exact. His 2012 Song Adhi Adhi Raat has a lyric which has become a meme sensation in 2019. In November 2019 Bilal released another single, "Baari" , feat Momina Mustehsan under One Two Records.
In November 2020, Bilal Saeed released the sequel of “Baari” , feat Momina Mustehsan named “Uchiyaan Deewara” under One Two Records.

Controversy 
In 2021, a video of Bilal Saeed fighting with his brother and proceeding to kick and punch him, went viral on social media. Even he kicked a woman, whom he claims to be his brother's friend.

Discography

Albums

Album "Twelve" Tracks

Compositions 
breakup dj abbas bashi (17 mar 2015 )
soniye dj abbas bashi  (04 dec 2014 )
Desi Thumka – Nouman Khalid ft. Osama Com Laude
 Jugni – Nouman Khalid ft. Bilal Saeed (26 May 2013)
 Choothi – Bilal Saeed ft. Waqar Ex (9 January 2014)
 Bewafa – Irfan Nazar ft. Bilal Saeed (4 April 2014)
 Lethal Combination – Bilal Saeed ft. Roach Killa (28 August 2014)
 Kaash ( a wish ) – Bilal Saeed
 Memories – Bonafide ft. Bilal Saeed (23 July 2015)
Paranday – Bilal Saeed (18 March 2016)
 Blah Blah Blah – Bilal Saeed ft. Young desi
No makeup – Bilal Saeed ft. Bohemia
 Twinkle Twinkle – Bilal Saeed ft. Young desi
 Suroor – Neha Kakar ft. Bilal Saeed
Hokah Hokah – Bilal Saeed ft. Muhfaad

Film

Awards and nominations 

|-
| style="text-align:center;"|2013
| style="text-align:center;"|"12 Saal"
| PTC Punjabi Music Award for Best Pop Vocalist
|
|-
| style="text-align:center;"|2013
| style="text-align:center;"|"Twelve"
| PTC Punjabi Music Award for Best Non Residents Punjabi Album
|
|-
| style="text-align:center;"|2013
| style="text-align:center;"|"Twelve"
| Punjabi Music Award for Best Non Resident Punjabi Vocalist
|
|-
| style="text-align:center;"|2014
| style="text-align:center;"|"Khair Mangdi"
| Lux Style Award for Song of the Year
|
|-
| style="text-align:center;"|2015
| style="text-align:center;"|"Bilal Saeed"
| Pakistani Music and Media Awards for Best Producer
|
|-
| style="text-align:center;"|2015
| style="text-align:center;"|"Bilal Saeed"
| Pakistani Music and Media Awards for Best International Act
|
|-
| style="text-align:center;"|2015
| style="text-align:center;"|"Bilal Saeed"
| Brit Asia Music Award for Best Songwriter
|
|-
| style="text-align:center;"|2015
| style="text-align:center;"|"Lethal Combination"
| Brit Asia Music Award for Best Single UK
|
|
|-
|2020
|style="text-align:center;"|"Baari"
| PISA Award For The Best Song Of The Year(2019)
|

References

External links 

 
Bilal Saeed YouTube

Living people
Pakistani pop singers
Pakistani songwriters
Pakistani composers
Pakistani record producers
Punjabi people
People from Sialkot
Punjabi-language singers
1988 births